Rita Dal Monte (born ) is an Italian wheelchair curler.

She participated in the 2006 Winter Paralympics where Italian team finished on seventh place.

Teams

References

External links 

Player profile - FISG - Federazione Italiana Sport del Ghiaccio (Italian Ice Sports Federation)

Living people
1961 births
Italian female curlers
Italian wheelchair curlers
Paralympic wheelchair curlers of Italy
Wheelchair curlers at the 2006 Winter Paralympics